The Isabelle Stevenson Award is a non-competitive philanthropic award presented as part of the Tony Awards to "recognize an individual from the theatre community who has made a substantial contribution of volunteered time and effort on behalf of one or more humanitarian, social service or charitable organizations, regardless of whether such organizations relate to the theatre." It is named for Isabelle Stevenson, a dancer who performed for audiences all round the world and was president and later chairperson of the board of the American Theatre Wing until her death in 2003. A single recipient is chosen by the Tony Award Administration Committee and may not be presented at every ceremony. The international press regards the Tony Awards as America's most prestigious theater awards.

The American Theatre Wing and The Broadway League present the winner with a copy of a circular brass and bronze medallion designed by art director Herman Rosse at an annual award ceremony in New York City. The award has been presented annually since the 63rd Tony Awards in 2009. Actress Phyllis Newman was chosen as its inaugural recipient for her work in establishing the Phyllis Newman Women's Health Initiative in 1995 and raising $3.5 million for the organization. Since then, another six women and five men have received the award and no one has won it more than once. As of the 75th Tony Awards in 2021, which honored theatre over the 2021–22 theater season, The Shubert Organization Chair and CEO Robert E. Wankel is the most recent winner in this category "his generosity and service to the welfare of our Broadway community, over the past four decades and, especially in the face of a global crisis, is immeasurable."

Recipients

See also
 Special Tony Award
 Society of London Theatre Special Award

References

External links

Tony Awards
Awards established in 2009
2009 establishments in the United States